Nelson Diaz or Díaz may refer to:

Nelson Díaz (footballer)
Nelson Diaz (lawyer)
Nelson Díaz (umpire)